The 2016–17 Delaware Fightin' Blue Hens men's basketball team represented the University of Delaware during the 2016–17 NCAA Division I men's basketball season. The Fightin' Blue Hens, led by first-year head coach Martin Ingelsby, played their home games at the Bob Carpenter Center in Newark, Delaware as members of the Colonial Athletic Association. They finished the season 13–20, 5–13 in CAA play to finish in ninth place. They defeated Hofstra in the first round of the CAA tournament to advance to the quarterfinals where they lost to UNC Wilmington.

Previous season 
The Fightin' Blue Hens finished the 2015–16 season 7–23, 2–16 in CAA play to finish in last place. They lost in the first round of the CAA tournament to College of Charleston.

Head coach Monté Ross was fired following the season. The school hired Martin Ingelsby as his replacement.

Departures

Incoming transfers

Under NCAA transfer rules, Woods will sit out the 2016–17 season, and will have three years of remaining eligibility entering the 2017–18 season.

Recruiting

Roster 

W

Schedule and results

|-
!colspan=9 style=| Non-conference regular season

 
 
 
 

|-
!colspan=9 style=| CAA regular season

 

|-
!colspan=9 style=| CAA tournament

See also
2016–17 Delaware Fightin' Blue Hens women's basketball team

References

Delaware Fightin' Blue Hens men's basketball seasons
Delaware
Delaware Fightin' Blue Hens men's b
Delaware Fightin' Blue Hens men's b